Osama Ibrahim Abdalla Morsi (born on 1 April 1993) is an Egyptian footballer who plays for Egyptian Premier League team National Bank of Egypt. Osama plays as right-back.

Honours

Club
Zamalek
Egypt Cup: 2016
Egyptian Super Cup: 2017

References

1993 births
Living people
Egyptian footballers
Egypt international footballers
Association football defenders
ENPPI SC players
Zamalek SC players
Smouha SC players
Egyptian Premier League players